Colonel James Hunter-Blair (22 March 1817 – 5 November 1854) was a British Conservative politician.

Family
He was the eldest son of Sir David Hunter-Blair, 3rd Baronet and Dorothea née Hay-Mackenzie. While he was intended to inherit the Baronetcy of Dunskey, Wigtown upon his father's death, his own premature death meant his younger brother, Edward, succeeded to the title.

Member of Parliament
In public service, Hunter-Blair was a Deputy Lieutenant for Ayrshire in 1845, before being elected Conservative MP for the county constituency at the 1852 general election and held the seat until his death in 1854.

Death
An active member of the military, Hunter-Blair was a Lieutenant-Colonel in the Scots Fusilier Guards from 1848, and was drafted to fight in the Crimean War, ultimately leading to his death at the Battle of Inkerman in 1854, which caused deep shock and sadness among his parliamentary colleagues. In a letter to Lady Elizabeth Jocelyn—Lady Londonderry and wife of Frederick Stewart, 4th Marquess of Londonderry—a few weeks after Blair's death, future prime minister Benjamin Disraeli said:

And, in a separate letter to Sarah Brydges Willyams in December 1854, Disraeli described Blair as "one of my most active aid-de-camps, & really invaluable both as a partisan & a friend", adding his death was a "severe loss to me".

In a later letter to Disraeli, Conservative MP for Petersfield William Jolliffe said: "Poor Blair is a sad loss to our party. No one was of greater use to Taylor & I than he was, and on many occasions did excellent service." Meanwhile, James Harris, 3rd Earl of Malmesbury, the Secretary of State for Foreign Affairs, stated: "Blair cannot be replaced for those who knew & liked him, either as a partisan or friend."

References

External links
 

UK MPs 1852–1857
1817 births
1854 deaths
Scottish Tory MPs (pre-1912)
Deputy Lieutenants of Ayrshire
British military personnel killed in the Crimean War
British Army personnel of the Crimean War